Ebba is a feminine given name, the feminine version of Ebbe, which is a diminutive form of the Germanic name Eberhard or Everhard, meaning "strong." Alternately, it may be a form of an Old English name Æbbe, of unknown derivation, which was the name of several early saints. The name was the 10th most popular name given to girls born in Sweden in 2009.

People
Ebba Amfeldt (1906–1974), Danish film actress
Ebba d'Aubert (1819–1860), Swedish concert pianist
Ebba Bielke (1570–1618), Swedish baroness convicted of high treason
Ebba Boström (1844–1902), Swedish nurse and philanthropist
Ebba Brahe (1596–1674), Swedish countess and courtier
Ebba Busch Thor (born 1987), Swedish politician, leader of the Christian Democrats
Ebba Carstensen (1885–1967), Danish-Swedish painter
Ebba Maria De la Gardie (1657–1697), Swedish poet and countess
Ebba De la Gardie (1867-1928), Swedish reporter 
Ebba Eriksdotter Vasa (died 1549), Swedish noble, mother of Queen Margaret and her sister Martha
Ebba Forsberg (born 1964), Swedish singer and actress
Ebba Haslund (1917–2009), Norwegian writer
Ebba Hultkvist Stragne (born 1983), Swedish child actress, TV personality and PR consultant
Ebba Jungmark (born 1987), Swedish high jumper
Ebba Leijonhufvud (1595–1654), Swedish countess and courtier
Ebba Lindkvist (1882–1942), Swedish actress and film director
Ebba Lindqvist (1908–1995), Swedish poet
Ebba Modée, (1775–1840), Swedish noble and courtier
Ebba Morman (1769–1802), Swedish stage actress
Ebba Munck af Fulkila (1858–1946), Swedish countess and titular princess, married Prince Oscar Bernadotte
Ebba Tove Elsa Nilsson (born 1987), Swedish singer known as Tove Lo
Ebba Ramsay (1828–1922), Swedish social worker, writer, and translator
Ebba Sparre (1629–1662), Swedish noble and courtier
Ebba Stenbock (died 1614), Swedish noble, sister of Queen Catherine and wife of Klaus Fleming, governor of Finland
Ebba Thomsen (1887–1973), Danish actress
Ebba von Sydow (born 1981), Swedish journalist and TV personality
Ebba Witt-Brattström (born 1953), Swedish academic in comparative literature and feminist profile
Æbbe of Coldingham (c. 615 – 683), Abbess of Coldingham and noblewoman
Æbbe the Younger (died 817), later abbess of Coldingham

Notes

Feminine given names
Scandinavian feminine given names
Danish feminine given names
Swedish feminine given names